Harranasaurus (meaning "Harrana lizard") is an extinct genus of globidensin mosasaur from Jordan. The genus contains one known species, H. khuludae from the Muwaqqar Formation of Jordan.

References 

Mosasaurines
Mosasaurs of Asia
Fossil taxa described in 2009
Mosasaurids